Sambucus racemosa subsp. racemosa is a subspecies of Sambucus racemosa, with the common names European red elder and Pacific red elderberry.

Distribution
The plant is native to Europe and to North America, in Western Canada and the Western United States.

Locations it is found in include Albania; Armenia; Austria; Belgium; Bulgaria; California; Canada; Czech Republic; France; Germany; Hungary; Italy; the Netherlands; Poland; Romania; Spain; Switzerland; the United States, and the present day states of former Yugoslavia.

Taxonomy
This particular trinomial name was automatically created by the subsequent discoveries of other subspecies within the binomial name. It is used to set it apart as the original species. Trinomials such as this are called autonyms.

References

External links

racemosa subsp. racemosa
Plant subspecies
Flora of British Columbia
Flora of the Western United States
Flora of Central Europe
Flora of Southwestern Europe
Flora of Southeastern Europe
Flora of Armenia
Vulnerable plants
Taxonomy articles created by Polbot